Norman Hepburn Baynes  (1877–1961) was a 20th-century British historian of the Byzantine Empire.

Career
Baynes was Professor of Byzantine History at University College London (UCL) from 1931 until 1942. He was given the title of Emeritus Professor in 1943 and Doctor of Literature honoris causa in 1951. His work included two fully annotated volumes of Hitler's pre-war speeches.

Death and after
In his will, Baynes made a bequest to UCLm which established 'The Norman Hepburn Baynes Prize' in 1961. The biennial prize is awarded in respect of "an essay on some aspect of history, including art, religion and thought of the Mediterranean lands within the period from 400BC to 1453AD".

Selected published works
Israel amongst the Nations (1927)
Intellectual liberty and totalitarian claim. The Romanes lecture for 1942 (Oxford: Clarendon Press, 1942)
The Speeches of Adolf Hitler, 1922-1939. Ed. Norman H. Baynes, 2 vols. (Oxford, 1942)
Byzantium: An Introduction to East Roman Civilization. Ed. Norman H. Baynes and H. St. L. B. Moss. (Oxford: Clarendon, 1948; Oxford Paperbacks, 1961). A collection of signed articles by authorities; good bibliography.
Constantine the Great and the Christian Church. Norman H Baynes. (1972) Second Edition, Raleigh Lecture, with a preface by Henry Chadwick.

References

External links

 List of works at openlibrary.org

1877 births
1961 deaths
Academics of University College London
British Byzantinists
Fellows of the British Academy
Scholars of Byzantine history
Presidents of The Roman Society